Telok Blangah MRT station is an underground Mass Rapid Transit (MRT) station on the Circle line, situated in Bukit Merah planning area, Singapore. It is located along Telok Blangah Road near the junction of Henderson Road, and primarily serves the residential neighbourhood of Telok Blangah.

The station is named after the nearby Telok Blangah estate, which was derived from Blangah in Malay meaning a stopping place, or Blanga referring to an Indian clay cooking pot in reference to the shape of the bay behind Keppel Harbour. It serves residential developments in the Telok Blangah Drive and Telok Blangah Heights area.

Art in Transit

The artwork featured under the Art in Transit programme is Notes Towards A Museum Of Cooking Pot Bay by Michael Lee. Located on the lift shaft in the station, the artwork intertwines monuments, pop culture elements, real-life people (including the artist himself) and fantastical elements in a massive concept map which, as the title suggests, aims to contribute to a museum of "Cooking Pot Bay", which is a translation of "Telok Blangah".

References

External links

 

Railway stations in Singapore opened in 2011
Bukit Merah
Mass Rapid Transit (Singapore) stations